Replantation or reattachment has been defined by the American Academy of Orthopaedic Surgeons as "the surgical reattachment of a body part (such as a finger, hand, or toe) that has been completely cut from the body".

Examples would be reattachment of a partially or fully amputated finger, or reattachment of a kidney that had had an avulsion-type injury.

Replantation of amputated parts has been performed on fingers, hands, forearms, arms, toes, feet, legs, ears, scalp, face, lips, penis and a tongue. It can be performed on almost any body part of children.

Medical uses
Replantation is performed in response to traumatic amputation. Sharp, guillotine-type injuries with relatively uninjured surrounding tissue have the best post-replantation prognosis, with a success rate of 77%.

Severe crush injuries, multi-level injuries, and avulsion injuries often mangle soft tissue to the point of precluding rejoining of essential blood vessels, making replantation impossible. In such cases, revision amputation of the stump may be necessary.

Technique 

Replantation requires microsurgery and must be performed within several hours of the part's amputation, at a center with specialized equipment, surgeons and supporting staff. To improve the chances of a successful replantation, it is necessary to preserve the amputate as soon as possible in a cool (close to freezing, but not at or below freezing) and sterile or clean environment. Parts should be wrapped with moistened gauze and placed inside a clean or sterile bag floating in ice water.  Dry ice should not be used as it can result in freezing of the tissue.  There are so called sterile "Amputate-Bags" available which help to perform a dry, cool and sterile preservation.

Parts without major muscle groups, such as the fingers, have been replanted up to 94 hours later, although 12 hours is typically the maximum ischemic time tolerated. Parts that contain major muscle groups, such as the arms, need to be replanted within 6–8 hours to have a viable limb. It is also important to collect and to preserve those amputates which do not appear to be good candidates for replantation. A microsurgeon needs all available parts of human tissue to cover the wound at the stump and prevent further shortening. In cases of multiple amputation, nerves and vessels from a non-replantable part can be used as graft material for a replanted part.

The repair of the nerves and vessels (artery and vein) of the amputated part is essential for survival and function of the replanted part of the body. Using an operating microscope for replantation is termed microvascular replantation. However, vessels and nerves of large amputated parts (e.g. arm and forearm) may be reconnected using loupe or no magnification.

In replantation surgery following macro-amputation (e.g. arm or leg amputation) maximal length of the replanted extremity can be preserved by vascular grafts for blood supply and pedicled or free soft tissue flaps for defect coverage.

Recovery 
Patients should recover in an Intensive Care Unit for 24 to 48 hours following replantation due to the need for frequent clinical assessments to monitor for signs of replantation failure. The most common and practical clinical assessment tool is temperature of the replanted part, which should be at least 31 °C. Other physical exam signs include capillary refill and color. Doppler ultrasound should be used to assess arterial blood flow in to the replanted part every hour. Maintaining adequate IV hydration helps to ensure perfusion of the replanted part.

Aspirin should be taken every day for up to 3 weeks following replantation to reduce the risk of blood clot at the site of the blood vessel anastomosis. Leech therapy can be used to remove blood from the replanted part if there are signs of venous congestion.

History 

The first replantation to be performed in the world involved repair of the brachial artery and was done by a team of chief residents led by Ronald Malt at Massachusetts General Hospital in Boston, Massachusetts, United States in 1962.  The arm of a 12-year-old child severed at the level of the proximal humerus was reattached.

The first report of a replantation using "modest magnification and keen vision" was reported by a team led by Zhong-Wei Chen of the Sixth People's Hospital in Shanghai in 1963 writing in the Chinese Medical Journal.  A machinist's hand was reattached at the level of the distal forearm.  In this case, vascular couplers were used for the vessels as the Chinese did not have good micro sutures available at that time.  As there was little communication between China and the Western World in those years, Ronald Malt and Charles McKhann published in JAMA in 1964 their first two replantations without referencing the earlier published article from China.

First revascularization of a partially amputated finger: Kleinert (1963)
First digital replantation: Komatsu & Tamai, Japan (1965)

In the Soviet Union the first replantation of the arm after its traumatic transhumeral amputation was performed by Professor Nicolai L. Volodos and his colleagues on January 19, 1977, in Kharkiv, Ukraine. The case was described in the central press, and became the catalyst for the beginning of microsurgery as a surgical specialty in Soviet medicine. Soon after that, new specialised microsurgical centers were founded in different regions of the Soviet Union.

See also 
 Amputation
 Microsurgery

References

External links
 eMedicine: Replantation

Surgical procedures and techniques
Amputations